The Philharmonic Dining Rooms is a public house at the corner of Hope Street and Hardman Street in Liverpool, Merseyside, England, and stands diagonally opposite the Liverpool Philharmonic Hall.  It is commonly known as The Phil.  It is recorded in the National Heritage List for England as a designated Grade I listed building.

History
The public house was built in about 1898–1900 for the brewer Robert Cain. It was designed by Walter W. Thomas (not to be confused with Walter Aubrey Thomas the designer of the Royal Liver Building) and craftsmen from the School of Architecture and Applied Arts at University College (now the University of Liverpool), supervised by G. Hall Neale and Arthur Stratton.

Paul McCartney performed at the Philharmonic when he was a young musician, and during an impromptu concert in 2018.

Architecture

Exterior
The building is constructed in ashlar stone with a slate roof in an "exuberant free style" of architecture.  It has a combination of two and three storeys, with attics and cellar. There are ten bays along Hope Street and three along Hardman Street.  Its external features include a variety of windows, most with mullions, and some with elaborate architraves, a two-storey oriel window at the junction of the streets, stepped gables, turrets with ogee domes, a balustraded parapet above the second storey, a serpentine balcony (also balustraded) above the main entrance in Hope Street, and a low relief sculpture of musicians and musical instruments.  The main entrance contains metal gates in Art Nouveau style, their design being attributed to H. Bloomfield Bare.

Interior
There are 5 floors in total, with the main bar interior decorated in musical themes that relate to the nearby concert hall.  These decorations are executed on repoussé copper panels designed by Henry Bloomfield Bare and by Thomas Huson, plasterwork by C. J. Allen, mosaics, and items in mahogany and glass.  Two of the smaller rooms are entitled Brahms and Liszt. Of particular interest to visitors is the high quality of the gentlemen's urinals, constructed in rose-coloured marble.

Appraisal

Pollard and Pevsner, in the Buildings of England series, state that it is the most richly decorated of Liverpool's Victorian public houses, and that "it is of exceptional quality in national terms".  The Grade I listing means that it is "of exceptional interest".  Pye describes it as one of Liverpool's "architectural gems".

See also

Grade I listed buildings in Liverpool
Architecture of Liverpool

References

External links

Official website

Pubs in Liverpool
Grade I listed buildings in Liverpool
Art Nouveau architecture in Liverpool
Art Nouveau restaurants
Buildings and structures completed in 1900
Grade I listed pubs in England
Hope Street, Liverpool